Diocese of Muyinga may refer to the following ecclesiastical jurisdictions:
 Roman Catholic Diocese of Muyinga (f. 1968), Burundi
 Anglican Diocese of Muyinga (f. 2005), Burundi